Per Tresselt (born 4 January 1937) is a Norwegian diplomat.

He was born in Bergen, and is a cand.jur. by education. He became deputy under-secretary of state in the Ministry of Foreign Affairs in 1983, served as the Norwegian ambassador to East Germany from 1989 to 1990, consul-general in united Berlin from 1990 to 1994 and ambassador to Russia from 1994 to 1999. In 2000 he was appointed as a judge in the EFTA Court.

References

1937 births
Living people
Diplomats from Bergen
Ambassadors of Norway to East Germany
Ambassadors of Norway to Russia
Norwegian expatriates in Germany
Norwegian judges
Lawyers from Bergen